A production team is the group of technical staff who produce a play, television show, recording, or film.  Generally the term refers to all individuals responsible for the technical aspects of creating of a particular product, regardless of where in the process their expertise is required, or how long they are involved in the project.  For example, in a theatrical performance, the production team includes not only the running crew, but also the theatrical producer, designers and theatre direction.

A production company in filmmaking is composed of a film crew and a television crew in video production.

In music, the term production team typically refers to a group of individuals filling the role of "record producer" usually reserved for one individual. Some examples of musical production teams include Matmos and D-Influence.

See also
Executive producer
Hip hop production
Impresario

References 

Mass media occupations
Theatrical occupations
Film and video terminology